Discophora timora, the great duffer, is a butterfly found in South Asia that belongs to the Morphinae subfamily of the brush-footed butterflies family.

Distribution
The great duffer ranges from Sikkim and Assam in India to Myanmar, Thailand, peninsular Malaysia, Singapore and Indochina.

A subspecies of the butterfly is found as a rare endemic in the Andaman Islands. It was recorded as Discophora continentalis andamanensis, Staudinger by William Harry Evans.

See also
List of butterflies of India
List of butterflies of India (Morphinae)
List of butterflies of India (Nymphalidae)

Cited references

References
 
 

Amathusiini
Butterflies of Asia
Butterflies of Indochina